Izer Aliu (born 15 November 1999) is a Swiss football player who plays as midfielder for Neuchâtel Xamax in the Swiss Challenge League.

Career
Aliu joined the FC Zurich youth academy in 2009 signing his first professional contract with the club in 2018. During the 2019-20 season, Aliu was loaned to FC Chiasso, and in September 2020, Aliu was loaned to SC Kriens. On July 9, 2022, Zurich announced that Aliu and the club had agreed to mutual termination of the player's contract. Aliu subsequently joined Neuchâtel Xamax.

Personal life
Born in Switzerland, Aliu is of Albanian and Macedonian descent.

References

External links
 FC Zurich Stats

1999 births
Living people
People from Adliswil
Swiss men's footballers
Switzerland youth international footballers
Swiss people of Albanian descent
Swiss people of Macedonian descent
FC Zürich players
FC Chiasso players
SC Kriens players
Neuchâtel Xamax FCS players
Swiss Super League players
Swiss Challenge League players
Association football midfielders
Sportspeople from the canton of Zürich